Armstrong College (originally the California School for Private Secretaries, also known as Armstrong Business College) is a defunct college in Berkeley, California for 70 years. The school building at 2210 Harold Way is a City of Berkeley Landmark.

History 
The college was founded in 1918 by J. Evan Armstrong of the University of California and he served as the school's president. The first location of the school was a small building on Shattuck Avenue. In 1923, the name changed to Armstrong College, and the campus relocated. Walter Ratcliff was an architect for its school buildings in 1923, for the second location. 

A plaque commemorates the school's history. Alumni include Jovy Marcelo and Annie Wu (businesswoman).

Closure 
For about 10 years it served as a training facility for the University of California, Berkeley. It was then acquired in 2009 by the Tibetan Nyingma Meditation Center and renamed Dharma College.

References

Education in Berkeley, California
Universities and colleges in Alameda County, California
Defunct private universities and colleges in California
Educational institutions established in 1918
1918 establishments in California